Tomasz Bednarek and Mateusz Kowalczyk were the defending champions; however, Kowalczyk decided not to participate.
As a result, Bednarek partnered up with Andreas Siljeström. They were eliminated by Leoš Friedl and Ivo Minář in the quarterfinals.
Martin Kližan and Alessandro Motti won the title, defeating Thomas Fabbiano and Walter Trusendi 7–6(3), 6–4 in the final.

Seeds

Draw

Draw

References
 Main Draw

Rai Open - Doubles
2011 Doubles